Sir Robert Williams, 9th Baronet (20 July 1764 – 1 December 1830) was a British politician who sat in the House of Commons from 1790 to 1830.

Williams was the son of Sir Hugh Williams, 8th Baronet and his wife Emma Rowland.

Williams was elected Member of Parliament for Caernarvonshire in 1790 and held the seat until 1826. He was then elected MP for Beaumaris and held the seat until his death in 1830.

Williams died at Nice, France at the age of 66.

Williams married Anne Lewis, daughter of Reverend Edward Hughes and Mary Lewis, on 11 June 1799. Their son Richard succeeded to the baronetcy, whilst their daughter Eliza Martha married Sir John Eardley-Wilmot, 2nd Baronet.

References

External links 
 

 

1764 births
1830 deaths
Baronets in the Baronetage of England
Members of the Parliament of Great Britain for Welsh constituencies
Members of the Parliament of the United Kingdom for Welsh constituencies
British MPs 1790–1796
British MPs 1796–1800
UK MPs 1801–1802
UK MPs 1802–1806
UK MPs 1806–1807
UK MPs 1807–1812
UK MPs 1812–1818
UK MPs 1818–1820
UK MPs 1820–1826
UK MPs 1826–1830
Members of the Parliament of the United Kingdom for Beaumaris